Jarkko Näppilä (born July 6, 1988) is a Finnish ice hockey defenceman. He is currently playing with Ilves in the Finnish Liiga.

Nappila made his SM-liiga debut playing with Ilves during the 2006–07 SM-liiga season.

Career statistics

References

External links

1988 births
Living people
Finnish ice hockey defencemen
Ilves players
Ice hockey people from Tampere
Jokipojat players
Lempäälän Kisa players